Geoscientist is a monthly magazine produced for the Fellowship of the Geological Society of London. The magazine was first published in 1990. It is editorially independent of the Geological Society's administration. It has a print run of 10,000 and is freely available to all Fellows. It is also freely available online to all.

See also
Earth science

References

Earth sciences
Free magazines
Geological Society of London publications
Magazines established in 1990
Magazines published in London
Monthly magazines published in the United Kingdom
Science and technology magazines published in the United Kingdom